Callisemaea is a genus of plants in the family Fabaceae. Species are from Mesoamerica.

References

External links 

 
 Callisemaea at Tropicos

Fabaceae genera
Fabaceae